The Indian shortfin eel, Anguilla bicolor pacifica, is a species of eel in the genus Anguilla of the family Anguillidae. The Indian shortfin eel typically lives in fresh water or brackish water. The habitat use of the Indian shortfin eel is dependent on environmental factors.

References

Anguillidae